The Great Jazz Trio at the Village Vanguard is a live album by the Great Jazz Trio. The Great Jazz Trio is pianist Hank Jones, bassist Ron Carter and drummer Tony Williams, recorded in 1977 for the Japanese East Wind label.

Reception 

Allmusic awarded the album 4½ stars, stating: "No matter which edition one hears of the Great Jazz Trio, leader Hank Jones can be counted upon to deliver the goods. ...On this occasion, Jones is ably accompanied by Ron Carter and Tony Williams, so it is no surprise the fireworks begin right away." On All About Jazz John Kelman noted: "Perhaps it's because, with their shared background as members of Miles Davis' landmark quintet of the mid-'60s, Carter and Williams were able to approach this more mainstream affair with just the right combination of unabashed swing and freer interpretation."

Track listing 
 "Moose the Mooche" (Charlie Parker) – 6:06
 "Naima" (John Coltrane) – 11:41
 "Favors" (Claus Ogerman) – 9:35
 "12+12" (Ron Carter) – 9:27

Personnel 
 Hank Jones – piano
 Ron Carter – bass
 Tony Williams – drums

References 

1977 live albums
Great Jazz Trio live albums
East Wind Records live albums
Albums recorded at the Village Vanguard